Hashieh Rud (also Romanized as Ḩāshīeh Rūd, Hashiyeh Rood, Ḩāshīyeh Rūd, and Hāsheyeh Rūd; also known as Ḩāsheh Rud, Aaysharud, Ḩasharūd, Hasharut, and Hashtrūd) is a village in Gowharan Rural District, in the Central District of Khoy County, West Azerbaijan Province, Iran. At the 2006 census, its population was 1,415, in 331 families.

References 

Populated places in Khoy County